Caryocolum interalbicella is a moth of the family Gelechiidae. It is found in France, Germany, Austria, Switzerland and Italy.

The length of the forewings is 7–8 mm for males and 6-7.5 mm for females. The forewings are dark brown with scattered ochreous scales. Adults have been recorded on wing from late June to late August.

The larvae feed on Cerastium arvense. They feed on the young shoots into which they occasionally bore. Larvae can be found in mid-April.

References

Moths described in 1854
interalbicella
Moths of Europe